Wellman Valley is a mainly ice-free valley lying just east of Midnight Plateau and north of Mount Ash in the Darwin Mountains. Explored by Victoria University of Wellington Antarctic Expedition (VUWAE), 1962–63, and named for H.W. Wellman, geologist of the Victoria University of Wellington, a participant in three Antarctic expeditions.

Valleys of Oates Land